Herbert S. Goldstein (February 8, 1890 – January 1970), was a prominent American rabbi and Jewish leader. He was the only person in history to have been elected president of the Union of Orthodox Jewish Congregations of America, the Rabbinical Council of America (first presidium), and the Synagogue Council of America. Globally, he fought for the survival and transplantation of European Jewry as an activist in the Vaad Hatzalah and the Agudath Israel.

Early life
Goldstein and his family were members of Beth Hamedrash Hagadol, where he had his Bar Mitzvah, and met his future father-in-law and renowned Jewish leader Harry Fischel.

He attended Etz Chaim Yeshiva, Townsend Harris High School, and Columbia University  (B.A., M.A.). He also graduated as valedictorian at the (then-more-traditional) Jewish Theological Seminary. He received rabbinic ordination both from Rabbi Shalom Elchanan Jaffe of Beth Hamedrash Hagadol, and from the Jewish Theological Seminary.

Leadership roles

Fights for Jewish rights 
He led many fights for Jewish rights, beginning with the fight to expose unscrupulous fraudulent “kosher” butchers, and their powerful backers; fought for the rights of the downtrodden, in many social settings and political arenas, including the successful fight for a historic Minimal Wage Law.

Institutional Synagogue 

As the founder of the original Institutional Synagogue in 1917, he was one of the creators of the Jewish Community Center idea, certainly within an Orthodox Jewish setting, where prayer was a major component. The synagogue services came first, and then came the gymnasium and the Olympic-size swimming pool.  The Institutional Synagogue, in its prime, served approximately 3000 people a day, and had a roster of 67 clubs. . The synagogue was located at 37 West 116th Street in Harlem.

Goldstein almost left the Institutional Synagogue to assume the pulpit of America's oldest synagogue, Congregation Shearith Israel, most commonly known as the Spanish and Portuguese Synagogue. Goldstein was to succeed the Reverend Doctor H. Pereira Mendes in 1921, but ultimately did not take the position. Goldstein stayed at the Institutional Synagogue, and its eventual successor, the West Side Institutional Synagogue. The latter was one of the most influential Orthodox synagogues in the country under his leadership during its most influential years.

Union of Orthodox Jewish Congregations of America 

As president of the Union of Orthodox Jewish Congregations of America (UOJCA) for close to a decade, he led the establishment of national kosher food endorsements, which became the symbol of the O.U., as well as a national organization for college youth (the precursor of Yavneh) and for high school youth (the precursor of the National Conference of Synagogue Youth (the NCSY).
 
As president of the UOJCA, he played a role in getting Yeshiva University recognized as such by the New York Board of Regents, by guaranteeing its financial viability on behalf of the UOJCA.

American Religious Palestine Fund 

He was president of the Keren Hayishuv, the American Religious Palestine Fund, and of the Save-A-Child Foundation, which evolved into the Homes for Children in Israel;

National Conference of Christians and Jews 

He was co-founder of the National Conference of Christians and Jews; he was one of the leading English-speaking fund-raisers in the Orthodox Jewish community when it was still dominated by Yiddish-speaking foreign born individuals.

Homiletics 

He also headed the homiletics department of the Yeshiva University's affiliated rabbinical school for decades, guiding virtually the first two generations of America's leading American-born and educated orthodox rabbis, having joined its staff shortly after he was ordained before World War I, and continuing almost until U.S. President John F. Kennedy sent advisers into Vietnam.

Writings 

The primary books authored by Rabbi Goldstein were: 'Bible Comments for Home Reading (The Five Books of the Chumash, plus the Book of Joshua), Between the Lines of the Bible (on each commandment in the Bible), and a commentary on the Pirkei Avot (The Ethics of the Fathers).

Notes

References
Goldman, Yosef, Hebrew Printing In America (YGBooks 2006).
 Goldstein, Herbert S. Forty Years of Struggle for a Principle: The Biography of Harry Fischel, Bloch Publishing Company, 1928.
 Gurock, Jeffrey S. "The Orthodox Synagogue", in Wertheimer, Jack. The American Synagogue: A Sanctuary Transformed, Cambridge University Press, 2003. 
 Reichel, Aaron I. The Maverick Rabbi—Rabbi Herbert S. Goldstein and the Institutional Synagogue -- "A New Organizational Form", Donning Company Publishers, 1984. 
 Reichel, Aaron I. "Pioneers of American Jewish Orthodoxy: Mr. Harry Fischel and Rabbi Herbert S. Goldstein", The Commentator, April 18, 2005.

Columbia University alumni
American Orthodox rabbis
1890 births
1970 deaths
Townsend Harris High School alumni
20th-century American rabbis